Osorkon (also Userken in older literature) was the name of many ancient Egyptians with Libyan ancestry. It could refers to:
 Osorkon the Elder:  a pharaoh of the 21st Dynasty
 Osorkon I: a pharaoh of the 22nd Dynasty
 Osorkon II: a pharaoh of the 22nd Dynasty
 Osorkon III: a pharaoh of the 23rd Dynasty in Upper Egypt
 Osorkon IV: a pharaoh of the 22nd or 23rd Dynasty in Lower Egypt
 Osorkon A: a High Priest of Ptah in Memphis during the 22nd Dynasty
 Osorkon B: a Theban High Priest of Amun and prince, now believed to be Osorkon III (see above) in his early career
 Osorkon C: a Great Chief of the Ma, predecessor of Tefnakht